Pallister is a surname. Notable people with the surname include:

 Brian Pallister (born 1954), Canadian politician
 David Pallister (1945–2021), British investigative journalist
 David Pallister (United States Air Force officer) (1915–2003), colonel in the U.S. Air Force
 Gary Pallister (born 1965), English former professional footballer
 Gordon Pallister (1917–1999), English footballer
 Graeme Pallister, Scottish chef and restaurateur
 Lani Pallister (born 2002), Australian swimmer
 Matthew Pallister (born 1969), Australian slalom canoeist
 Minnie Pallister (1885–1960), English political activist
 William Pallister (1884–1904), English footballer